Then & Now... the Best of The Monkees is a compilation album of songs by the 1960s American pop group the Monkees, released by Arista Records in 1986.

With the 1986 revival of "Monkeemania", Arista Records issued a new Monkees "best of" collection, including three new recordings featuring vocals by Micky Dolenz and Peter Tork: "That Was Then, This Is Now", "Anytime, Anyplace, Anywhere" and a remake of the Paul Revere and the Raiders hit, "Kicks". Neither Michael Nesmith nor Davy Jones participated in the new recordings. Nesmith also did not join the 1986 tour with the reassembled Monkees (aside from joining them for an encore in one show), while Jones did. However, Jones would leave the stage when the new songs were performed.

Its follow-up, a remix of "Daydream Believer" (featuring a modern drum sound), hit . At the end of the print run of Then and Now..., Arista inadvertently replaced the original version of "Daydream Believer" with this updated remix on the records and cassettes. The second vinyl version is denoted by an "RE-1" etched into the LP's inner groove.

The track listings for the LP and CD releases differed greatly, with the LP version featuring 14 tracks and the CD version expanded to 25. At the time of its release, the CD version was the most comprehensive career-spanning Monkees compilation to date in the U.S..

Originally, Arista had decided to release a 2-LP set with only classic material. After the decision was made to include new material, the 2-LP set got released as a mail-order collection from Silver Eagle Records. This album contains the same front and back images as the later release, but the title is simply The Best of the Monkees (missing the Then & Now) and there are no liner notes. This rare version of the album has 24 tracks, closer to the lineup on the Then & Now CD but with a slightly different order and song selection. "Mary, Mary", "Good Clean Fun" and "Tear Drop City" are all unique to this variation, while "Look Out (Here Comes Tomorrow)" would not be added until the Then & Now CD release.

Track listing

Arista CD

 "Take a Giant Step" runs at a different speed than the original version on the album The Monkees.
 "A Little Bit Me, a Little Bit You" is the original stereo version, missing handclaps.
 "Valleri" marks the first appearance of the song with a "cold ending" as opposed to a fade-out.
 "Porpoise Song" is the extended single version.
 "Listen to the Band" is the full-length mono album version.

Arista LP

Silver Eagle 2-LP

References 

The Monkees compilation albums
1986 compilation albums
Arista Records compilation albums